Rizo Šurla (12 January 1922 – 11 February 2003), also known as Rizo Harapi, was a Montenegrin photographer, actor and anti-fascist fighter who fought in the ranks of the Yugoslav Partisans during World War II.

Biography 
Rizo Šurla was born on 12 January 1922 in Ulcinj, then part of the Kingdom of Yugoslavia. His family belonged to the Afro-Albanian community of Ulcinj. African slaves had been brought by the captains of the fleet of Ulcinj in the 18th century. In the 19th century, they gained their freedom and began to integrate themselves in the local community. His father, Saidi, was a direct descendant of the first Africans who settled in Ulcinj and his mother, Fatima was a local from Ulcinj. In his youth he was involved in boxing and worked as a waiter in Dubrovnik. He then went to Belgrade, where he learned the craft of photography. During World War II, he joined the Yugoslav Partisans. After the war, he returned to Ulcinj, where he opened the first photographic studio in the city, which for a long time was the only one. In 1976 he played in the movie Jagoš and Uglješa. He married a Montenegrin from Ulcinj named Nada Račić, with whom he had two children.

He died on 11 February 2003 in his hometown. He was one of the last black representatives in the city.

References 

1922 births
2003 deaths
People from Ulcinj
Montenegrin people of African descent
Montenegrin people of Albanian descent
Yugoslav male actors
Montenegrin actors
Yugoslav Partisans members